Ports de Morella, is a historical Valencian comarca. It takes its name from the city of Morella, its capital and the only place in the region having been granted the title of 'city'.

It mostly overlaps with the present-day Ports comarca except for the municipal areas surrounding Catí and Vilafranca that were excluded from the present-day Ports administrative division.

See also
Maestrat
Tinença de Benifassà

Bibliography
Juan Piqueras, Geografia de les comarques valencianes, Foro Ediciones SL, Valencia 1995. 
Mª José Ribera Ortún & Bernardí Cabrer Borrás, Los desequilibrios espaciales: Una comarcalización del Pais Valenciano. Ed. Institut de Estudios de Administración Local. Valencia, 1979.

References

Historical comarques of the Valencian Community
Mountain ranges of the Sistema Ibérico